Tharangambadi railway station is a railway station is Tamil Nadu in Mayiladuthurai district. This railway station is under gauge conversion under the project unigauge. Currently it is a defunct railway station.

References

Railway stations in Mayiladuthurai district